Snell Valley is a depression landform in Napa County, California. This feature is located approximately five miles north of Aetna Springs. The valley is noted for its diversity of wildflowers, and within Snell Valley is the Missimer Wildflower Preserve. An example of wildflowers in Snell Valley is Gold Nuggets, Calochortus luteus.

History 
Snell Valley was part of Rancho Guenoc when it was deeded as part of a Mexican land grant in 1845. It is assumed that the valley is named after George and Hiram Snell, two brothers from Germany, who were documented as residents of the Guenoc Rancho in 1857.

See also

Snell Creek

Line notes

References
 David L. Durham. 2001. Durham's place names of California's old wine country, page 65
 C. Michael Hogan. 2009. Yellow Mariposa Lily: Calochortus luteus, GlobalTwitcher.com, ed. N. Stromberg

Valleys of California
Valleys of Napa County, California